Jorge Teixeira Ramos (born 15 August 1978), known as Jorge Ramos, is a Brazilian retired footballer who played as a forward.

Career
Born in Montes Claros, Minas Gerais, Ramos moved to Portugal with G.D. Chaves, after playing for Porto-PE, and scored once for the club in eight appearances. After returning to Brazil in 1999, he joined Sport Recife, but was loaned to Íbis for the 2000 campaign after featuring rarely.

Ramos represented Gama in 2001, He subsequently represented Lagartense, América de Natal, Rio Negro-AM, Cabofriense, Ferroviário do Recife and Petrolina before retiring in 2008.

In September 2014, Ramos was named manager of Náutico-RR's under-20 squad. He left the club in December to take over the same category of Altinho.

Personal life
Ramos' son Kaio Jorge is also a footballer and a forward. He was groomed at Santos.

References

External links

1978 births
Living people
People from Montes Claros
Brazilian footballers
Association football forwards
Clube Atlético do Porto players
Sport Club do Recife players
América Futebol Clube (RN) players
Atlético Rio Negro Clube players
Associação Desportiva Cabofriense players
Primeira Liga players
G.D. Chaves players
Brazilian expatriate footballers
Brazilian expatriate sportspeople in Portugal
Expatriate footballers in Portugal
Brazilian football managers
Sportspeople from Minas Gerais